

The SAIMAN 200 was a 1930s Italian two-seat primary trainer designed and built by the Società Industrie Meccaniche Aeronautiche Navali (SAIMAN).

Development
Designed as a basic trainer, the first SAIMAN 200 prototype first flew at the end of 1938. It was a wooden conventional biplane with wide track tailwheel landing gear, powered by a nose-mounted 185 hp (138 kW) Alfa-Romeo 115 engine. Two prototypes with 120 hp (74 kW) Alfa-Romeo 110 engines were also built, designated the SAIMAN 205. Two aircraft were sold to the Italian airline Ala Littoria which were followed by three production batches for the Regia Aeronautica. Caproni-Vizzola built 115 aircraft and SAIMAN built 25. Early accidents in use resulted in structural strengthening and modification to the production aircraft.

Operational history
The SAIMAN 200 was used by Regia Aeronautica primary training schools and some were also used for liaison duties. After the 1943 armistice the surviving aircraft were also used by the Italian Co-Belligerent Air Force, the Germans and the Allies.

Variants
SAIMAN 200
Production aircraft with an Alfa Romeo 115 engine, 128 built.
SAIMAN 205
Powered by an Alfa Romeo 110 engine, only two prototypes.

Operators

Air Force of the Independent State of Croatia

Luftwaffe

Ala Littoria
Regia Aeronautica
Italian Co-Belligerent Air Force

Italian Air Force

Specifications

See also

References

 

1930s Italian military trainer aircraft
Biplanes
Single-engined tractor aircraft
Aircraft first flown in 1938